Concealing Fate is the debut extended play by British progressive metal band Tesseract, released on 11 October 2010. "This is a concept album based on life and its obstacles," said vocalist Daniel Tompkins which was featured on a bonus DVD along with their first studio album  One (2011). Concealing Fate is split into 6 parts: "Acceptance", "Deception", "The Impossible", "Perfection", "Epiphany" and "Origin". A live studio playthrough of the EP was also included as a bonus DVD along with One, and a video for "Deception" (Concealing Fate Part 2) was released in 2010.

Track listing

Personnel
Acle Kahney – guitars
Jay Postones – drums
James Monteith – guitars
Amos Williams – bass
Daniel Tompkins – vocals

References

2010 debut EPs
Tesseract (band) albums
Century Media Records EPs